Tribal War Records was a punk rock record label formed in 1991 in New York City by ex-Nausea singer, Neil Robinson. The label operated out of Brooklyn, New York until relocating to Portland, Oregon in 1997. The label released recordings by the notable punk bands such as the anarchist band Aus-Rotten, The Casualties, DIRT, and Oi Polloi among others. In addition to the label's own roster, the label also worked as a touring distro, distributing works by other punk bands, labels, and presses, such as Ak Press and Profane Existence.

Roster
 2000 Ds
 Anti-Product
 Age
 Aus-Rotten
 Avail
 Axiom
 Behind Enemy Lines
 The Casualties
 Coltus
 Confrontation
 Contravene
 Cress
 DIRT
 Dom Dar
 Final Massacre
 Final Warning
 Godless
 Harum-Scarum
 Hellkrusher
 Hellsister
 The Hysterics
 In Anger
 Kochise
 The Krays
 Mankind?
 Monument To Ruins
 Murdered Minority
 Oi Polloi
 Power of Idea
 Recharge
 Resist and Exist
 Riot/Clone
 Sarcasm
 Social Outkast
 Stracony
 TDF
 Thought Crime
 Union
 Wardance Orange
 Warning

References

External links
  Label page at Discogs
  Label page at Musicbrainz

American independent record labels
Record labels established in 1991
Punk record labels
Hardcore record labels
Entertainment companies based in New York City
Companies based in Portland, Oregon